Roxbury is an unincorporated community in McPherson County, Kansas, United States.  As of the 2020 census, the population of the community and nearby areas was 70.  It is located about 10.5 miles east of Interstate 135.

History
In 1854, the Kansas Territory was organized, then in 1861 Kansas became the 34th U.S. state and in 1867, McPherson County was established within the Kansas Territory.  The original name for the community was Colfax, which was established in 1871 with a trading post.  It was renamed to Roxbury on March 4, 1875 due to an act of legislature.

There is a post office serving Zip Code 67476, a bank, and a grain storage facility by way of businesses in Roxbury.

Demographics

For statistical purposes, the United States Census Bureau has defined Roxbury as a census-designated place (CDP).

Education
Roxbury is served by the Smoky Valley USD 400 public school district.  Its own schools were closed in 1965 due to school unification. The Roxbury High School team name was Roxbury Lions.

Notable people
 Wendell Johnson, psychologist
 Duane Pope, convicted bank robber and murderer

References

Further reading

External links
 Historic Images of Roxbury, Special Photo Collections at Wichita State University Library
 McPherson County maps: Current, Historic, KDOT

Census-designated places in Kansas
Census-designated places in McPherson County, Kansas
1875 establishments in Kansas
Populated places established in 1875